Krasnogorsky (Lušmara) is an urban locality (an urban-type settlement) in Zvenigovsky District of the Mari El Republic, Russia. As of the 2010 Census, its population was 6,699.

History
Urban-type settlement status was granted to it in 1939.

Administrative and municipal status
Within the framework of administrative divisions, the urban-type settlement of Krasnogorsky, together with ten rural localities, is incorporated within Zvenigovsky District as Krasnogorsky Urban-Type Settlement (an administrative division of the district). As a municipal division, Krasnogorsky Urban-Type Settlement is incorporated within Zvenigovsky Municipal District as Krasnogorsky Urban Settlement.

References

Notes

Sources

Urban-type settlements in the Mari El Republic